Bhaskar Sunkara (born June 1989) is an American political writer. He is the founding editor of Jacobin, the president of The Nation, and publisher of Catalyst: A Journal of Theory and Strategy and London's Tribune. He is a former vice-chair of the Democratic Socialists of America and the author of The Socialist Manifesto: The Case for Radical Politics in an Era of Extreme Inequality as well as a columnist for The Guardian US.

Early life
Sunkara was born in the United States to parents of Indian ancestry who had migrated to the US from Trinidad and Tobago a year before he was born. Sunkara credited his politicization to his reading as a teenager: from George Orwell's Nineteen Eighty-Four and Animal Farm he developed an interest in Leon Trotsky, reading his autobiography and Isaac Deutscher's three-volume biography, before progressing to the New Left, including thinkers such as Lucio Magri, Ralph Miliband, Perry Anderson and the journal New Left Review. He joined the Democratic Socialists of America at the age of 17, becoming editor of the DSA youth section's blog The Activist. He went on to study history at George Washington University in Washington, D.C., where he conceived the idea of Jacobin: after his sophomore year, he missed two semesters due to illness, and spent the time reading Marxist works.

Career
By the summer of 2010, he was preparing to return to his studies and inspired to create the magazine, which launched online in September of that year and in print at the beginning of 2011.

Sunkara described Jacobin as a radical publication, "largely the product of a younger generation not quite as tied to the Cold War paradigms that sustained the old leftist intellectual milieus like Dissent or New Politics".

The New York Times interviewed Sunkara in January 2013, commenting on Jacobin unexpected success and engagement with mainstream liberalism. In late 2014, he was interviewed by New Left Review on the political orientation and future trajectory of the publication and in March 2016 was featured in a lengthy Vox profile.

Sunkara writes for Vice magazine, The New York Times, The Washington Post, Vox, Foreign Policy, and The Nation, among other outlets. He has appeared on the PBS Tavis Smiley program, MSNBC's Up with Chris Hayes, and the FX show Totally Biased with W. Kamau Bell.

On February 23, 2022 The Nation named Sunkara to the role of president, replacing Erin O'Mara.

Awards and recognition 
In 2020, Sunkara was named to Fortune magazine's "40 Under 40" list under the "Government and Politics" category.

References

External links
Jacobinmag.com
The Socialist Manifesto: The Case for Radical Politics in an Era of Extreme Inequality (Basic Books, 2019).
 Bhaskar Sunkara articles for The Guardian

American political writers
George Washington University alumni
People from White Plains, New York
Living people
American people of Trinidad and Tobago descent
American male non-fiction writers
American publishers (people)
Members of the Democratic Socialists of America
Writers from New York (state)
American people of Punjabi descent
American male writers of Indian descent
American Marxists
1989 births
21st-century American male writers
21st-century American non-fiction writers